Haram-e Motahhar-e Emam Khomeini Metro station, formerly simply called Haram-e Motahhar Metro Station, is a station of Tehran Metro Line 1. The next station is Shahed - Bagher Shahr on the north side and Kahrizak on the south side. It is located east of Mausoleum of Khomeini.

References 

Tehran Metro stations